Two Outs in the Ninth Inning is a 2007 South Korean television series starring Soo Ae, Lee Jung-jin, Lee Tae-sung and Hwang Ji-hyun. It aired on MBC from July 14 to September 9, 2007 on Saturdays and Sundays at 21:40 for 16 episodes.

The romantic comedy series explores the age-old question of whether a man and a woman can ever be just friends. As the title suggests, the series makes plenty of baseball references, with each of its sixteen episodes opening with a catchy phrase relating the facts of life through the game of baseball.

Plot
Aspiring writer Hong Nan-hee is a foul-mouthed, disheveled and jaded single woman struggling with life and love. She and Byun Hyung-tae have been best friends for most of their lives. They cook for each other, call each other daily, bicker like siblings, and support each other when things go wrong. But everything is about to change. On her 30th birthday, Nan-hee realizes that she needs to shake things up. She begins dating Kim Jung-joo, a talented baseball pitcher who is aiming to play in the American big leagues; but Nan-hee's mother disapproves of their relationship because he is eight years younger. Tired of living with her mother, she rents Hyung-tae's house while he is on vacation, but complications arise and soon the two friends are living in the house together. As the old friends navigate new territory, they start to discover things they never knew about each other — he's neurotic, she snores — but more importantly, they gradually realize what their friends and family have always suspected — that, without realizing it, they've been the most important people to each other all along.

Cast
 Soo Ae as Hong Nan-hee
 Lee Jung-jin as Byun Hyung-tae
 Lee Tae-sung as Kim Jung-joo
 Hwang Ji-hyun as Yoon Sung-ah
 Lee Sang-woo as Lee Joon-mo
 Jo Eun-ji as Kim Choon-hee
 Son Jung-min as Jeon Mi-kyung
 Jang Joon-hwi as Park Sang-hoon
 Park Hye-young as Park Ji-sun
 Hwang Seok-jeong as Jang Choo-ja
 Lee Doo-il as Im Nak-bin
 Im Yoona as Shin Joo-young
 Kim Chang-sook as Kim Shin-ja
 Lee Hee-do as Byun Jong-woo
 Lee So-won as Hong Yeon-hee
 Park Kwang-jung as Mr. Park, advertisement team leader
 Jung Da-hye as Kim Nam-jung
 Yoon Ye-hee as Kyung-ha
 Yoon Hye-jung
 Park Woo-cheon

Remake
Indonesia's SCTV and MD Entertainment produced a remake in 2009 titled Cinta Nia, starring Nia Ramadhani and Marcell Darwin.

References

External links
 Two Outs in the Ninth Inning official MBC website 
 Two Outs in the Ninth Inning at MBC Global Media
 
 

Korean-language television shows
MBC TV television dramas
2007 South Korean television series debuts
2007 South Korean television series endings
South Korean romantic comedy television series
Baseball television series